Ted Rusoff (May 20, 1939 – September 28, 2013) was a Canadian voiceover artist, actor, vocal coach, and translator specializing in the adaptation and translation from and into various languages of synchronized dialogue for the dubbing of films and cartoons. Highly prolific with over 100 credits to his name, Rusoff is best remembered for his work adapting and performing English-language dialogue for countless Italian genre films.

As an actor, he had appeared in more than 70 films. Fluent in many languages, he is often called upon for work as language/accent/dialogue consultant for dubbings, theater, and cinema. He has worked many times as a stage-director for regular plays and as stage-director and music-coach for opera in houses in Marseilles, Copenhagen, Munich, Prague, Riga, Montivideo, Tokyo, Auckland, and elsewhere. He has been active as a choral director, known for his "Liebslieder Waltzes" and other choral masterpieces by Brahms, as well as the music of composers of the Baroque period.

Life and career 
Born in Winnipeg, Manitoba, Rusoff was the son of screenwriter and film producer Lou Rusoff and the nephew of Samuel Z. Arkoff, the head of American International Pictures. Rusoff started his career as a singer, appearing in operas, musical comedies, and on the road in various cities in Canada and the United States with his guitar during the folk-singing boom of the late 1950s and early 1960s. He specialized in foreign language songs, including Ghanaian and Māori. He also appeared in nearly all the Gilbert and Sullivan operas, acting in a wide variety of roles. He toured with a trio called The Catch Club, along with his fellow music-students from UCLA, David Reznick and Larry Pack. They sang catches, or rounds, from the English Restoration period, and appeared throughout North America whilst recording an album.

In 1963, he relocated to Europe, where using his knowledge of languages, began overseeing the dubbing of English-language AIP films into Italian, French, and German. Since then, he has worked as sync-adapter and dubbing director of more than 500 films, and as a dubber his voice can be heard in more than 1000 films, providing the voice for numerous leading men as well as many villains in a number of Italian cult favorites such as The Whip and the Body (1963), Deep Red (1975), Beyond the Darkness (1979) and many others. He has also worked extensively dubbing films into Italian and French, often supplying foreign languages or accents.  As a dubbing director he is known for his extensive work for the English-language versions of foreign – predominantly Italian – films. He has also sync-adapted, acted in, and directed the dubbing of films shot in Turkish, Finnish, Greek, Danish, Hebrew, and Korean as well as the standard European cinema languages.

Since the early 1980s, Rusoff has also done much work as an actor in film and television. He started out with supporting roles – often playing authority figures or religious characters such as priests, rabbis or monks. His earliest film roles were in Joe d'Amato's horror film Absurd (1981) and in Marco Ferreri's Tales of Ordinary Madness (1981), based on the works of Charles Bukowski, and Franco Zeffirelli's La Traviata (1983) alongside Plácido Domingo. He also acted together with his wife, Carolyn De Fonseca, in the Pia Zadora starring vehicle The Lonely Lady (1983), and he and De Fonseca played husband and wife, the parents of Mussolini's mistress Claretta Petacci in the TV miniseries Mussolini and I (1985), with Bob Hoskins in the title role.

Throughout the rest of the 1980s and 1990s, Rusoff acted in low-budget B-movies such as Catacombs (1988), where he plays a monk; Sinbad of the Seven Seas (1989) with Lou Ferrigno, where he plays the keeper of the torture chamber; and the Jean-Claude Van Damme flick Double Team (1997), where he plays a hacking-inclined Italian monk. However, he also had roles in many acclaimed films such as Martin Scorsese's The Last Temptation of Christ (1988), alongside Max von Sydow in the TV movie A Violent Life (1991), in which he played Pope Paul III, Tinto Brass' The Voyeur (1994) and, in a film about the life of Pope John XXIII, The Good Pope (2002), as a rabbi working with the future Pope Angelo Roncalli in his efforts to free a shipload of Jews in Istanbul and send them to Israel. Rusoff also played the Chief Elder in Mel Gibson's controversial Biblical epic The Passion of the Christ (2004) and Julius Caesar's Greek slave Strabo in the popular HBO series Rome (2005–2007).

Personal life 
Rusoff was married to his long-time colleague, voice actress Carolyn De Fonseca, until her death in 2009. He died in Rome, Italy, on September 28, 2013, more than a month after being hit by car.

List of dubbing roles (incomplete)

Filmography

References

External links 

1939 births
2013 deaths
Canadian male singers
Canadian male voice actors
Canadian male screenwriters
Canadian male stage actors
Canadian voice directors
Film directors from Winnipeg
Male actors from Winnipeg
Musicians from Winnipeg
Writers from Winnipeg
Canadian male musical theatre actors
20th-century Canadian translators